Gorenje is a small settlement in the Municipality of Lukovica in the eastern part of the Upper Carniola region of Slovenia.

Name
Gorenje was attested in historical sources as Goreynach in 1385, Kôrench  1400, and Goreyne in 1458, among other spellings. The name Gorenje is shared by several settlements in Slovenia. It arose through ellipsis of Gorenje selo (literally, 'upper village'), denoting the elevation of the place in relation to a neighboring settlement. Gorenje stands about  higher than Suša, the nearest neighboring village.

References

External links 
Gorenje on Geopedia

Populated places in the Municipality of Lukovica